Lonely Revolutions is a compilation album by the Scottish band Biffy Clyro, originally released on 23 August 2010 and only available on 12" vinyl (limited to 300 pressings). The album features B-sides from the band's 5th album, Only Revolutions. The album was subsequently released on CD (limited to 1000 copies). In June 2014 the album was released digitally on Amazon, iTunes and Spotify worldwide.

Track listing

Credits
Produced and recorded by Biffy Clyro, except 'Paperfriend' Produced by GGGGarth & Biffy Clyro
Mixed by Mark Williams, except "Hawkwind", "Creative Burns" & "Lonely Revolutions" by Ben Kaplan and "Paperfriend" by Andy Wallace
Mastered by Frank Arkwright & Howie Weinberg
Design and photography Stormstudios

References

External links
Official website

Biffy Clyro albums
2010 compilation albums
B-side compilation albums